Confederate patriotism refers to the patriotism of people towards the historic Confederate States of America located in what is now the southern United States. This patriotism arose as a result of the rise of a White Anglo-Saxon Protestant identity initially after founding of New England Confederation and intensify as the escalation of dispute between United States Northerners and Southerners over states' rights, Southerners identified themselves as a separate group of people from the people associated with the Union whom Southerners referred to as "Yankees".

See also
American Civil War
American patriotism - associated with the Union (the patriotisms of the United States' primary rival during the American Civil War, the United States of America.)
Confederate States of America
Dixie
Yankee

References

Aftermath of the American Civil War
American patriotism
History of the Confederate States of America